The N500 Naviplane was a French hovercraft built by SEDAM (Société d'Etude et de Développement des Aéroglisseurs Marins) in Pauillac, Gironde for the cross channel route. Intended to have a large passenger and crew capacity, it was for a while the largest hovercraft. Only two were built. The first was destroyed by a fire before entering service, the second proved unreliable and was broken up in 1985 at the end of its service.

History 
 N500-01 - Côte d'Argent registered LV 365.832 port of Le Verdon, Gironde estuary.
First flight on 19 April 1977 on the Gironde, demonstrating a speed of 40-45 knots (74–83 km/h). She was destroyed by a fire at her construction site on 3 May 1977.
 N500-02 - Ingénieur Jean Bertin registered BL 341.931 port of Boulogne Sur Mer.
Built for Seaspeed by SNCF in 1977. Transferred to Hoverspeed in 1983 after a number of modifications but was returned to SNCF later that year after Hoverspeed decided she was not suitable for their services. Broken up in 1985 at the Boulogne Hoverport.

The N500 was one of the world's largest hovercraft; it could transport 400 passengers, 55 cars and 5 buses. It was also one of the fastest and reached a speed record for a travel from Boulogne to Dover at an average speed of 74 knots (137 km/h).

The mass of the N500 was 260 tons, it was 50 m long and 23 m wide.

Crew
1 pilot.
1 co-pilot.
Seated side by side in the cockpit.
1 radar-navigator seated at the rear part of the cockpit.

6 to 8 stewardess.

6 stower-men for the cars.

Flight control
Flight yokes controlled the horizontal tail wing (elevator), propeller pitch and the thrust power of the 3 propulsion gas turbines

Rudder pedals controlled the two aerial rudders.

Two thrust levers controlled power of the two lifting gas turbines.

Obturation flaps system between the air cushion chamber and the skirts provided additional longitudinal and lateral control.

Later modifications (1983) included:
 A third rudder on the middle engine pylon.
 Four air vent system providing additional lateral control at low speed.

Specifications (N500)

See also
 Aérotrain
 Mountbatten class hovercraft

References

External links 
 Les Naviplanes
 Transcript of a SEDAM publicity brochure
 N500 Naviplane gallery
 Images of the transfer of the "Ingénieur Jean Bertin" from its production site to Boulogne

Hovercraft
1977 ships